Karin Fossum (born 6 November 1954) is a Norwegian author of crime fiction, often referred to as the "Norwegian queen of crime".

Early life
Karin Mathisen was born on 6 November 1954 in Sandefjord, in Vestfold county, Norway. She currently lives in Sylling, near Oslo. Fossum debuted as a poet with Kanskje i morgen, her first collection published in 1974 when she was just 20. It won Tarjei Vesaas' debutantpris. For a time she worked in hospitals, nursing homes and assisted with rehabilitation of drug addicts.

Writing career
Fossum began her literary career as a poet. She is the author of the internationally successful Inspector Konrad Sejer series of crime novels, which have been translated into 25 languages and honoured with several awards.

She won the Glass Key award for her novel Don't Look Back, which also won the Riverton Prize, and she was shortlisted for the Crime Writers' Association Gold Dagger in 2005 for Calling Out For You.

La ragazza del lago, internationally released as The Girl by the Lake, is a 2007 Italian thriller-drama film directed by Andrea Molaioli, in his directorial debut. It is based on the 1996 novel Don't Look Back (Se deg ikke tilbake!).

Bibliography

Inspector Sejer Series
(also featuring Inspector Jakob Skarre):

 1995 - Eva's Eye / In the Darkness (Evas øye); English translation 2012
 1996 - Don't Look Back (Se deg ikke tilbake!); English translation 2002
 1997 - He Who Fears the Wolf (Den som frykter ulven); English translation 2003
 1998 - When the Devil Holds the Candle (Djevelen holder lyset); English translation 2004
 2000 - Calling Out For You (Elskede Poona); English translation: 2005; American translation: The Indian Bride, 2007
 2002 - Black Seconds (Svarte sekunder); English translation 2007
 2004 - The Murder of Harriet Krohn (Drapet på Harriet Krohn); English translation 2014
 2007 - The Water's Edge (Den som elsker noe annet); English translation 2009
 2008 - Bad Intentions (Den onde viljen);  English translation 2010
 2009 - The Caller (Varsleren); English translation 2011
 2013 - The Drowned Boy (Carmen Zita og døden); English translation 2015
 2014 - Hell Fire (Helvetesilden); English translation 2016
 2016 - The Whisperer (Hviskeren); English translation

The character of Sejer appeared in a series of Norwegian TV adaptations starring Bjørn Sundquist in the role, with Christian Skolmen as Sejer's partner Jacob Skarre.

Other writings 
1974 - Kanskje i morgen – poetry
1978 - Med ansiktet i skyggen – poetry
1992 - I et annet lys - short stories
1994 - Søylen - short stories
1999 - De gales hus - novel
2002 - Jonas Eckel - novel
2003 - The Night of November 4th (Natt til fjerde november);
2006 - Broken (Brudd); English translation 2008
2011 - Jeg kan se i mørket  (English translation 2013 I Can See in the Dark)
2012 - Natten er et annet land - poetry (The Night is Another Land)

Awards 
Tarjei Vesaas' debutantpris 1974, for Kanskje i morgen
Rivertonprisen 1996, for Se deg ikke tilbake
Glass Key award 1997, for Se deg ikke tilbake
Bokhandlerprisen 1997, for Den som frykter ulven
Brage Prize 2000, for Elskede Poona
Martin Beck Award 2002, for Svarte sekunder
Cappelen Prize 2003
The Gumshoe Awards for best European crime novel 2007, for Når djevelen holder lyset (translated as: When the Devil Holds the Candle")
Los Angeles Times Book Prize in the category Mystery/Thriller for 2007 published in 2008, for Elskede Poona (translated as: "The Indian Bride")

References

External links
NRK:  Karin Fossum
  Cappelen Damm: Karin Fossum
Harcourt Books: Karin Fossum
   NRK Forfatter: Karin Fossum
Dagbladet: Karin Fossum

1954 births
Living people
Norwegian crime fiction writers
People from Sandefjord
People from Lier, Norway
Norwegian women novelists
Norwegian women poets
Women mystery writers
20th-century Norwegian poets
21st-century Norwegian poets
20th-century Norwegian women writers
21st-century Norwegian women writers